The  Las Vegas Locomotives season was the third season for the United Football League franchise.

Offseason

UFL draft

Personnel

Staff

Roster

Schedule

Standings

Game summaries

Week 1: at Sacramento Mountain Lions

Week 2: at Virginia Destroyers

Week 4: vs. Omaha Nighthawks

Week 5: at Omaha Nighthawks

References

Las Vegas Locomotives season
Las Vegas Locomotives seasons
Las Vegas Locomotives